Estoloides flavoscutellaris is a species of beetle in the family Cerambycidae. It was described by Galileo, Bezark and Santos-Silva in 2016.

References

Estoloides